Takayoshi Nakao (中尾 孝義, Nakao Takayoshi, born February 16, 1956, in Hyogo Prefecture) is a former Japanese professional baseball player. He was a catcher. In 1982, he was the MVP of the Central League.

His career lasted 13 seasons, from 1981 to 1993.

References

1956 births
Living people
Baseball people from Hyōgo Prefecture
Senshu University alumni
Japanese baseball players
Yomiuri Giants players
Chunichi Dragons players
Seibu Lions players
Nippon Professional Baseball MVP Award winners
Japanese baseball coaches
Nippon Professional Baseball coaches